Jean Boucher can refer to the following people:
 Jean Boucher (artist) (1870–1939), French sculptor
 Jean Boucher (politician) (1926–2011), member of the Canadian House of Commons
 Jean Boucher (MNA) (active since 2014), Canadian politician in Quebec

See also 
 Georges Mounin (1910–1993), French linguist who sometimes wrote under the name 'Jean Boucher'